Margaret Reaney Memorial Library is a historic library building located at St. Johnsville, Montgomery County, New York.  It is a one-story, Classical Revival style brick building over a raised basement.  It consists of a cruciform plan main block constructed in 1909, and a 1936 "T"-plan addition.  The front facade features a projecting entrance portico.  The building is placed in the contributing Village Memorial Park with a Soldiers Monument (1937) and a Bronze Sculpture (1898) by Roland Hinton Perry (1870-1941).

It was added to the National Register of Historic Places in 2012.

References

Libraries on the National Register of Historic Places in New York (state)
Neoclassical architecture in New York (state)
Library buildings completed in 1909
Buildings and structures in Montgomery County, New York
National Register of Historic Places in Montgomery County, New York